Orthomecyna phaeophanes is a moth of the family Crambidae. It is endemic to the Hawaiian islands of Kauai, Oahu, Molokai and Maui.

External links

Crambinae
Endemic moths of Hawaii